Uzlomac is a long mountain in Bosnia and Herzegovina (Bosnia),  east from line direction Maslovare –  Vrbanjci – Kotor Varoš – Čelinac. It stretches from the southeast to the northwest through the mountainous area, from Kruševica River (west of Borja mountains) to Jošavka.

The mountain is very rich in mixed forests resources and hunting wildlife, including Bosnian endemic quarry mammals. Its forest wealth is diverse: deciduous oak and deciduous beech. It also is rich in water resources: springs, streams and rivers. On Uzlomac many tributaries of Vrbanja river, Usora and Ukrina rise, i.e. tributaries of  Vrbas and Bosna confluences.

See also 
Vrbanjci
Kotor Varoš
Čelinac
Vrbanja river
Bosanka (river)
Jezerka
Bosnian endemic quarry mammals

References 

Mountains of Bosnia and Herzegovina